Nergizev Hanım ("daffodil"; 1830 - 26 October 1848 o 1858), called also Nergizu Hanim or Nergis Hanim, was a consort of Sultan Abdulmejid I of the Ottoman Empire.

She was Circassian, by Natuhay tribe. She had two brothers, Ibrahim Bey and Hüseyn Bey, and two sisters, Mihrinur Hanım e Münevver Hanım, who lived with her in Istanbul. Her brothers became Kaymakam.

Nergizev married Abdulmejid in 1847, was given the title of "Fourth Ikbal". On 7 July 1848, a year after the marriage, she gave birth to her only child, a son, Şehzade Mehmed Fuad in the Old Çırağan Palace. The prince died at the age of two months on 28 September 1848.

She died of tuberculosis a month after the death of her son, on 26 October 1848, but other source says that she died on 26 October 1858. She was buried in the mausoleum of Refia Sultan  in New Mosque, Istanbul.

Issue

In literature
Nergizev is a character in Hıfzı Topuz's historical novel Abdülmecit: İmparatorluk Çökerken Sarayda 22 Yıl: Roman (2009).

See also
Ikbal (title)
Ottoman Imperial Harem
List of consorts of the Ottoman sultans

References

Sources

Sureyya Mehmed Bey. Sicill-i Osmani / ed. Nuri Akbayar. - Istanbul: Tarih Vakfi Yurt Yayınlar, 1996. - P. 10. - ISBN 975-333-049-5 , 975-333-038-3.
Alderson An. D. The Structure of Ottoman dinasty  . - Oxford: Clarendon Press, 1956. - 186 pag.
Acba, Harun. Kadın efendiler: 1839-1924  (tur.) . - Profilo, 2007. - S. 55–56. — 221 pag. - ISBN 978-9-759-96109-1 .

1848 deaths
19th-century people from the Ottoman Empire
Ottoman Sunni Muslims
Deaths in childbirth
Consorts of Abdulmejid I
1830 births